Nasher is a sub-district located in As Sudah District, 'Amran Governorate, Yemen. Nasher had a population of 8554 according to the 2004 census.

References 

Sub-districts in As Sudah District